Gather/scatter is a type of memory addressing that at once collects (gathers) from, or stores (scatters) data to, multiple, arbitrary indices. Examples of its use include sparse linear algebra operations, sorting algorithms, fast Fourier transforms, and some computational graph theory problems. It is the vector equivalent of register indirect addressing, with gather involving indexed reads, and scatter, indexed writes. Vector processors (and some SIMD units in CPUs) have hardware support for gather and scatter operations.

Definitions

Gather
The gather of  into , denoted , assigns  with  having already been calculated. Assuming no pointer aliasing between x[], y[],idx[], a C implementation is

for (i = 0; i < N; ++i)
    x[i] = y[idx[i]];

Scatter
The sparse scatter, denoted  is the reverse operation. It copies the values of  into the corresponding locations in the sparsely populated vector , i.e. .

for (i = 0; i < N; ++i)
    y[idx[i]] = x[i];

Support 

x86-64 CPUs which support the AVX2 instruction set can gather 32-bit and 64-bit elements with memory offsets from a base address. A second register determines whether the particular element is loaded, and faults occurring from invalid memory accesses by masked-out elements are suppressed. The AVX-512 instruction set also contains (potentially masked) scatter operations. The ARM instruction set's Scalable Vector Extension includes gather and scatter operations on 8-, 16-, 32- and 64-bit elements. InfiniBand has hardware support for gather/scatter.

Without instruction-level gather/scatter, efficient implementations may need to be tuned for optimal performance, for example with prefetching; libraries such as OpenMPI may provide such primitives.

See also  
 SIMD	 
 Vectorization
 Compute kernel
 Memory access pattern

References

Parallel computing
SIMD computing